Ed Jenkins National Recreation Area, originally designated as Springer Mountain National Recreation Area, is a national recreation area in Fannin and Union counties in  the U.S. state of Georgia. Springer Mountain, near the center of the recreation area, is the southern terminus of the Appalachian Trail.

References

Protected areas of Fannin County, Georgia
Protected areas of Union County, Georgia
National Recreation Areas of the United States
1991 establishments in Georgia (U.S. state)
Appalachian Trail
Protected areas established in 1991